Domesticated plants of Mesoamerica, established by agricultural developments and practices over several thousand years of pre-Columbian history, include maize and capsicum. A list of Mesoamerican cultivars and staples:

Maize

Maize was domesticated in Western Mexico and Mesoamerican cultures expanded wherever it was cultivated. It became widespread in the Late Archaic Period and was grown wherever conditions allowed.

The early use of maize focused on the consumption of unripened kernels. Before people settled into villages and began farming, the amount of time it took to invest in maize was too great. The output of wild maize did not justify the time and work needed to grow the crop.

However, maize could be both dried and stored which was very important to early Mesoamericans as it could be used on a year-round basis. Drying meant that it could be transported as well. The common bean (Phaseolus vulgaris) was often grown with maize. These two plants provide complementary dietary amino acids. Improved bioavailability of maize was discovered using a special process involving limewater, which also added calcium.

Maize is also associated with festival and feast foods. Before it was domesticated and became a main crop, maize was used as a basis for beer. Beer was transported in decorated vessels and ceramic pottery. These vessels could be taken to social and ritual occasions.

Ritual events or festivals, such as ball games, feasts, and calendar turnings, involved the royal members who took part in the sacrifice of blood-letting and piercing as repayment to the gods for having given maize to the people that year.

Another example of how maize played such a large role in Mesoamerica, is when deities were portrayed with maize.  Quetzalcoatl is connected as being a creator of humans in Mesoamerica.  This deity is also seen as the one who took maize from the underworld and gave it to humans in the present world.

Capsicum

Capsicum is the generic name of the chili pepper plant, which is a native domesticated plant from Mesoamerica.  Capsaicin reduces the bacterial load when something can not be refrigerated.  In Mesoamerica, the capsaicin spice was also used to relieve joint pain, and as an intestinal stimulant, so capsicum is also known as a medicinal plant.  The peppers from capsicum plants can be used in a fresh or dried state.  A dried chile pepper is stronger and more effective than a fresh chile pepper.

During the Middle Archaic Period or the Coxcatlán phase, between 5700-3825 BC, the domestication of plants, such as the chile, was thought to have begun.  Mesoamerica's chile crops along with the majority of other food crops, were all domesticated by the Late Formative Period.  When the domestication of crops began, the majority of people were working at cultivating fields and crops like the chile.  Chiles were a relied on source of food in Mesoamerican times.  Chile crops were combined with maize, beans, and squash crops.

Chiles were a part of trade and gift giving.  Chiefs or other elite members would use foods and stews spiced with chiles when involved in a feast.  Using such strongly spiced foods was to show a stylistic and powerful approach to those receiving the dishes.

The chile plant was featured in different stews including vegetables, turkey, and dog meats and in chile-spiced tomato salsa with tortillas.  Chiles were also added at times to cacao, when it was in a beverage form.  In Mesoamerica, chiles were used for ritual purposes and therefore, the chile crops did not extend into North and South America like maize, beans, and squash.  A cuisine distinct to Mesoamerica was a maize-and-chile pepper based food.

Squash 
Pumpkins, zucchini, acorn squash, others.

Pinto bean 
Frijol pinto ("painted/speckled" bean) nitrogen-fixer traditionally planted in conjunction with the "two sisters", maize and squash, to help condition soil; runners grew on maize)

Tomato 

A member of the nightshade or potato family. The word refers both to the plant and the fruit.

Potato 

A member of the nightshade family. The word refers to both the plant and the tuber. It is related to the tomato and eggplant.

Avocado 

Related to the laurel, cinnamon, and camphor plants. Also known as "aguacate" in Spanish.

Chicle 
Also known as chewing gum.

Chocolate

Vanilla 

Vanilla is a flavoring derived from orchids of the genus Vanilla native to Mexico. Etymologically, vanilla derives from the Spanish word "", little pod. Originally cultivated by Pre-Columbian Mesoamerican peoples, Spanish conquistador Hernán Cortés is credited with introducing both vanilla and chocolate to Europe in the 1520s. Attempts to cultivate the vanilla plant outside Mexico and Central America proved futile because of the symbiotic relationship between the tlilxochitl vine that produced the vanilla orchid and the local species of Melipona bee; it was not until 1837 that Belgian botanist Charles François Antoine Morren discovered this fact and pioneered a method of artificially pollinating the plant. The method proved financially unworkable and was not deployed commercially. In 1841, a 12-year-old French-owned slave by the name of Edmond Albius, who lived on Île Bourbon, discovered the plant could be hand pollinated, allowing global cultivation of the plant.

There are currently three major cultivars of vanilla grown globally, all derived from a species originally found in Mesoamerica, including parts of modern-day Mexico. The various subspecies are Vanilla planifolia (syn. V. fragrans), grown on Madagascar, Réunion and other tropical areas along the Indian Ocean; V. tahitensis, grown in the South Pacific; and V. pompona, found in the West Indies, Central and South America. The majority of the world's vanilla is the V. planifolia variety, more commonly known as "Madagascar-Bourbon" vanilla, which is produced in a small region of Madagascar and in Indonesia.

Vanilla is the second most expensive spice after saffron, due to the extensive labor required to grow the vanilla seed pods. Despite the expense, it is highly valued for its flavor, which author Frederic Rosengarten Jr. described in The Book of Spices as "pure, spicy, and delicate" and its complex floral aroma depicted as a "peculiar bouquet." Despite its high cost, vanilla is widely used in both commercial and domestic baking, perfume manufacture and aromatherapy.

Black raspberry

Pineapple 
Cultivated extensively.

Nopales 
Stem segments of prickly pear, the Opuntia cactus.

Tunas
Fruits of many different species of cultivated Opuntia cactus.

Jicama 

Jícama (from Nahuatl xicamatl), also Yam and Mexican Turnip, is the name of a native Mexican vine, although the name most commonly refers to the plant's edible tuberous root. Jícama is one species in the genus Pachyrhizus. Plants in this genus are commonly referred to as yam bean, although the term "yam bean" can be another name for jícama. The other major species of yam beans are also indigenous within the Americas.

Papaya 

Originally from southern Mexico, particularly Chiapas and Veracruz, Central America and northern South America, the papaya is now cultivated in most tropical countries, such as Brazil, Bangladesh, Pakistan, India, Indonesia, South Africa, Sri Lanka, Vietnam, Philippines and Jamaica.  In cultivation, it grows rapidly, fruiting within 3 years.  It is, however,  highly frost sensitive.

Guayaba 
Guava fruit.

Huautli 
Amaranth grain; other species present on other continents.

Cherimoya 
Fruit.

Mamey 
Fruit, other parts of plants have noted uses.

Sunflower seeds 
Under cultivation in Mexico and Peru for thousands of years, also source of essential oils.

Cassava 
Edible starchy root also known as manioc; also used to make tapioca.

Chaya 
Also known as tree spinach.

Tepary bean

Cultivated from Arizona to Costa Rica.  Also gathered from the wild in hot, arid, and semi-arid climates

Tobacco 
note: the tobacco plant was cultivated throughout Central America, the Caribbean and North America.

See also
 Domesticated plants and animals of Austronesia

References

 

 
.
Lists of plants
.
Early agriculture in Mesoamerica
Domestication of particular species